Barton and Tredworth is an area of Gloucester, England that lies just outside the Eastgate of the city and has a population of 10,953 at the 2011 Census. Up to 45 different communities live in the area and as many as 50 languages are spoken here.

Barton and Tredworth is currently involved in a project to record the memories of the people living in the area both past and present.

Barton is one of the few places in England still to elect a Mock Mayor.

There are few areas with Segregated Bicycle Paths such as Metz Way and Trier Way.

References

External links 
Barton and Tredworth ward at the Gloucestershire County Council website
home page for 'Hidden Lives' the website for the memories and stories of Barton and Tredworth
Barton Fayre & the Mock Mayor of Barton.
 Neighbourhood Watch Scheme in Tredworth Gloucestershire

Areas of Gloucester